Muhammad Abdul Aleem Siddiqi  (3 April 1892 – 22 August 1954) was an Islamic scholar, spiritual master, author and preacher from Pakistan. He was a student of Imam of Ahlus Sunnah Imam Ahmad Raza Khan Muhaddith barelwi Rahimahullah. He was leader of the All Malaya Muslim Missionary Society, Singapore (now known as Jamiyah Singapore).

Life
Siddiqi was born on 3 April 1892 in Meerut and was descendant of Abu Bakr. It is said that he had memorized the Quran by the age of four, and obtained a degree in Islamic theology at the age of 16.
He learned the natural and social sciences.

Missionary activities
Siddique traveled extensively overseas for 40 years to preach and propagate Islam. 
He advocated inter-religious harmony and spread message of peace and came to seem by some people as a Roving Ambassador of Peace.

In 1930 he went to Singapore as a missionary. In 1932 he took the lead in establishing the All-Malaya Muslim Missionary Society (now known as Jamiyah Singapore). This society had branches all over the Malaya.
The All-Malaya Muslim Missionary Society (now known as Jamiyah Singapore) named the Masjid Abdul Aleem Siddique after him. In early 1949, he founded the Inter-Religious Organization of Singapore and Johor Bahru with the total support of the British Colonial Government and leaders of the Hindu, Jewish, Zoroastrian (Parsi), Christian, Sikh, Buddhist and Muslim leaders from Singapore and Johor Bahru. The then president of Jamiyah Singapore, Syed Ibrahim Omar Alsagoff, who was already active in inter faith work assisted him by garnering the support and cooperation of the other religious leaders or representatives.

He visited Trinidad in 1950 and launched World Islamic Mission (WIM) at Port of Spain Jama Mosque.

In 1926, he founded, the Muslim Association of the Philippines (MUSAPHIL) which became an influential organization in Philippines.
In the early 1950s, his visit to Manila encouraged some Muslims to revive the madrasah system of education.

His disciple and son-in-law Muhammad Fazlur Rahman Ansari was also a scholar, who established Aleemiyah Institute of Islamic Studies, an English-medium institution of Islamic theology, named after Abdul Aleem Siddiqui, in Karachi, Pakistan.

Politics
A supporter of the Pakistan Movement and a friend of Jinnah, at partition his family relocated there where his son, Shah Ahmad Noorani, became a political figure and at one time was head of the opposition in Pakistan's parliament .

He led Pakistan's first Eid prayer.

Books and booklets
Some of his works include:
Elementary teachings of Islam
The principles of Islam
A Shavian and a theologian : an illuminating conversation between George Bernard Shaw, the sceptic, and Mohammed Abdul Aleem Siddiqui, al-Qaderi, the spiritualist at Mombasa, Kenya
The forgotten path of knowledge
The history of the codification of Islamic law : being an illuminating exposition of the conformist view-point accepted by the overwhelming majority of the Islamic world

Further reading
Eric Roose (2009). The Architectural Representation of Islam: Muslim-commissioned Mosque Design in the Netherlands. Amsterdam University Press. .

References

External links
Information on Muhammad Abdul Aleem Siddiqui (1892-1954)
Abdul Aleem Siddique Mosque

Pakistani Sunni Muslim scholars of Islam
Pakistan Movement activists
Muhajir people
Islam in Pakistan
Islam in Singapore
Islam in Malaysia
Siddiqi
Siddiqi
Siddiqi
People from Meerut
Siddiqi
Sunni Sufis
Barelvis